Photosynthetic is the tenth album and third live album by Australian improvised music trio The Necks released on the Russian Long Arms label in 2003. The album features a single track, titled "Photosynthetic", performed by Chris Abrahams, Lloyd Swanton and Tony Buck recorded live at DOM Cultural Center, Moscow on 29 March 2002.

Track listing
 "Photosynthetic" - 42:22
All compositions by The Necks
Recorded live at DOM Cultural Center on 29 March 2002

Personnel
Chris Abrahams — piano
Lloyd Swanton — bass
Tony Buck — drums

References

The Necks live albums
2003 live albums